Carol Sente (born July 10, 1961) is a former Democratic member of the Illinois House of Representatives, representing the 59th Representative District from September 2009 until January 2019. The district includes all or part of Vernon Hills, Prairie View, Buffalo Grove, Green Oaks, Indian Creek, Lincolnshire, Mundelein, Riverwoods, and Wheeling.

Sente was appointed to the 59th District seat on September 12, 2009, after her predecessor, Kathleen A. Ryg, resigned to rejoin the private sector. On September 12, 2017, Sente announced her intention not to stand for reelection in 2018.

References

External links
 Rep. Carol Sente (D) 59th District, at the Illinois General Assembly, 
 Bills where this Rep. appeared as primary sponsor (with link in each leading to all sponsored bills): 98th General Assembly (GA), ; 97th GA, ; 96th GA, 
Carol Sente at Illinois House Democrats
State Representative Carol Sente constituency site
Carol Sente for State Representative

1961 births
Living people
Democratic Party members of the Illinois House of Representatives
Women state legislators in Illinois
21st-century American politicians
21st-century American women politicians
People from Vernon Hills, Illinois